The Denver and Rio Grande Western K-37 is a class of  "Mikado" type narrow-gauge steam locomotives built for the Denver and Rio Grande Western Railroad. They were all new steam locomotives rebuilt in the D&RGW Burnham Shops as a cheaper option to new Baldwin K-36s but were in fact more expensive. Burnham Shops was assisted in the construction of the class by the Stearn-Rogers Manufacturing Company. The class used components recycled from Baldwin Locomotive Works built Class 19 (later C-41) 2-8-0 locomotives used on the Rio Grande's standard gauge; re-using the boiler, tender and other components salvaged from the C-41's.  The engine components; particularly the frames, valve gear, wheels and counter weights , were constructed new for the locomotive class.

Design 
The locomotives are of outside-frame design, with the driving wheels placed between the two chassis frames which support the boiler, but with the cylinders, driving rods, counterweights and valve gear on the outside. This general arrangement is shared with the earlier K-27, K-28 and K-36 Mikado type engines.

History 
The locos worked out of Salida, Colorado to Gunnison, Colorado and up the Crested Butte Branch as well as the Monarch Branch. The locos also worked out of Alamosa, Colorado to Antonito over Cumbres Pass to Chama and on to Durango and the Farmington branch. Like the K-36s the locos were not permitted West of Gunnison or on the Silverton branch. However, the Silverton branch has since been upgraded to handle K-36s and K-37s. Three of the K-37s, Nos. 491, 493 and 499, were equipped with steam heat and signal lines so they could haul passenger trains like the San Juan Express and Shavano.

Of the eight preserved K-37s, locomotive #497 has operated on both the Durango and Silverton Narrow Gauge Railroad (D&SNG) in Durango, Colorado from 1984 to 1991 and on the Cumbres and Toltec Scenic Railroad (C&TSRR) in Chama, New Mexico from 1992 to 2002. In late 2002, #497 was taken out of service, and as of 2021, it currently sits inside the Chama roundhouse awaiting a future overhaul. 

The D&RGW operated #491 from 1928 to 1963, but in 1947 it added thermic siphons to improve efficiency by increasing heating surface area in the firebox. It was a test case applying these boiler improvements, which were common on standard-gauge locomotives, to a narrow-gauge locomotive. After sitting in a static display for decades, in August 2014, locomotive #491 was restored to operating condition at the Colorado Railroad Museum and operated for the first time in public on Saturday, September 13, 2014 at the annual Thomas the Tank Engine event. A ticketed "roll out" was hosted on August 29, 2014.  

Although the K-37s are actually about 2% lighter than the K-36s, they were erroneously thought to be much harder on track.  The D&SNG originally owned four of the surviving K-37s, but they found that the #497 was too hard on their track and didn't handle the Animas Canyon section of the route as well as they would have hoped. Consequently, they traded #497 to the C&TSRR for K-36 #482 and #499 to Royal Gorge Park in Canon City for #486. However, the problems experienced by the D&SNG are now thought to have been isolated to locomotive #497's trailing truck and not universal to all K-37s.

Conversion to Oil 
Steam locomotives are a popular and attractive element of heritage railroads like the Durango and Silverton Narrow Gauge Railroad and the Cumbres and Toltec. Burning coal tends to produce cinders, which can be a primary source of ignition for wildfires. Converting an engine from coal to oil eliminates the source of cinders. This will allow the engines to run when drought conditions would warrant replacing a steam engine with a diesel locomotive to decrease the probability of ignition. 

On May 4, 2016, the D&SNG, in cooperation with the Colorado Railroad Museum, transported locomotive #493 to Durango after resting in Silverton for almost 20 years with the plan of having the museum transport it to Golden, Colorado and have it restored as well. However, after plans with the museum fell through, the D&SNG decided to undertake the restoration of #493 themselves. In the restoration process of #493 however, the locomotive was converted to oil-burning, making it the very first former D&RGW 2-8-2 to be converted to oil-burning instead of coal-burning, the next one being K-28 class #473. On January 24, 2020, #493 moved under its own power for the first time in over 50 years, making it the first D&RGW K-37 class since #497 to run on the D&SNG. #493 then ran its first revenue run on the D&SNG on February 14, 2020. On February 16, 2022, the C&TSRR announced that #492 and #497 are both being evaluated to see which one is more fit for restoration to operating condition, though it is unclear if the chosen locomotive will also be converted from coal-burning to oil-burning.

Roster

Conversion Myth 

Although debunked by historical sources, including official accounts from the D&RGW, some railfans continue to claim that the K-37 was actually either a standard gauge locomotive class converted to narrow gauge, or were part of an order for standard gauge locomotives that was canceled. Both of these myths are unfounded.

References

External links

2-8-2 locomotives
K-37
Baldwin locomotives
3 ft gauge locomotives
Railway locomotives introduced in 1928
Railway locomotives introduced in 1902
Steam locomotives of the United States
2-8-0 locomotives
Freight locomotives
Rebuilt locomotives